Chimmad  is a village in the southern state of Karnataka, India. It is located in the Jamkhandi taluk of Bagalkot district in 𝐊𝐚𝐫𝐧𝐚𝐭𝐚𝐤𝐚. 𝐈𝐭 𝐢𝐬 𝐛𝐢𝐠 𝐯𝐢𝐥𝐥𝐚𝐠𝐞 𝐢𝐧 𝐑𝐚𝐛𝐤𝐚𝐯𝐢 - 𝐁𝐚𝐧𝐡𝐚𝐭𝐭𝐢 𝐭𝐚𝐥𝐮𝐤. 𝐓𝐡𝐢𝐬 𝐯𝐢𝐥𝐥𝐚𝐠𝐞 𝐢𝐬 𝐚𝐥𝐬𝐨 𝐟𝐚𝐦𝐨𝐮𝐬 𝐢𝐧 𝐍𝐨𝐫𝐭𝐡 𝐊𝐚𝐫𝐧𝐚𝐭𝐚𝐤𝐚 𝐟𝐨𝐫 𝐊𝐢𝐜𝐡𝐚𝐝𝐢 𝐣𝐚𝐭𝐫𝐚

Demographics
In the 2001 India census, Chimmad had a population of 8,721 with 4,390 males and 4,331 females.

In the 2011 census, Chimmad reported a population of 10,717.

See also
 Bagalkot
 Districts of Karnataka

References

External links
 http://Bagalkot.nic.in/

Villages in Bagalkot district